Leonard Preyra (born February 10, 1955) is a Canadian politician. He represented the riding of Halifax Citadel-Sable Island in the Nova Scotia House of Assembly from 2006 to 2013. He was a member of the Nova Scotia New Democratic Party.

Career
Prior to becoming an MLA, Preyra was a professor in the political science department at Saint Mary's University in Halifax, Nova Scotia.

Political career
He was first elected in the 2006 election in an open seat, defeating Progressive Conservative candidate and unsuccessful leadership candidate Bill Black.

Preyra was named the Ministerial Assistant for the Office of Immigration in June 2009. On May 30, 2012, Preyra was appointed to the Executive Council of Nova Scotia as Minister of Communities, Culture, and Heritage.

Preyra was defeated when he ran for re-election in the 2013 election.

References

People from Halifax, Nova Scotia
Nova Scotia New Democratic Party MLAs
Members of the Executive Council of Nova Scotia
Living people
Indian emigrants to Canada
1955 births
21st-century Canadian politicians
Canadian politicians of Indian descent
Academic staff of the Saint Mary's University (Halifax)